The Honor System is a 1917 American silent drama film directed by Raoul Walsh and starring Milton Sills and Cora Drew. The film established Walsh as a director. It was based on a novel of the same name by Henry Christeen Warnack.

Cast

Preservation
With no prints of The Honor System located in any film archives, it is a lost film.

See also
1937 Fox vault fire

References

External links

The Honor System at TCMDB
The Honor System at BFI

1917 films
American silent feature films
American black-and-white films
Silent American drama films
1917 drama films
Lost American films
1910s English-language films
Fox Film films
1917 lost films
Lost drama films
1910s American films